The Scuole Piccole of Venice are confraternities in the Republic of Venice. Unlike the more famous Scuole Grandi, membership in them was not restricted to citizens and indeed some of them were formed specifically for foreigners. Most Scuole, the scolae communes, were devoted to a particular saint or devotional cult, but some, the scuole delle arti, were associated with specific crafts or trade guild, and often obligatory for the members of that trade.

The confraternities were officially divided into Piccole 'small' and Grandi 'great' in 1467. By the fall of the Republic, there were 925 scuole piccole. Almost all scuole, grandi and piccoli, were suppressed by Eugène de Beauharnais, the Napoleonic Viceroy of Italy, in 1806–1807.

Besides commissioning some artworks for their own meeting houses—though not on the scale of the Scuole Grandi—many scuole also donated altarpieces to churches.

Some Scuole Piccoli had dedicated meeting houses; many did not, and met in parish or conventual churches. Some of the meeting places of these confraternities have been preserved.

List

 Scuola degli Albanesi
 Scuola dei Greci
 Scuola dei Mercanti
 Scuola di San Giorgio degli Schiavoni
 Scuola di Sant'Orsola

Bibliography

 Richard MacKenney, "The Scuole Piccole of Venice: Formations and Transformations", in Nicholas Terpstra, ed., The Politics of Ritual Kinship: Confraternities and Social Order in Early Modern Italy, 2000, p. 172
 Associazione Culturale Venezia Arte, Cultura e Turismo, "Scuole Grandi and Scuole Piccoli in Venice", 
 Jonathan Glixon, Honoring God and the city: music at the Venetian confraternities, 1260-1807, 2002,

Notes

Confraternities
Buildings and structures in Venice
Republic of Venice